Alan Moultrie Mylne (2 January 1886, Mumbai – 5 March 1944, Malvern) was Archdeacon of Matabeleland from 1928 until 1936.

The son of Louis Mylne, bishop, Alan was educated at Marlborough, Keble College, Oxford and Cuddesdon Theological College.

He was a Lay Reader at Cathcart, Eastern Cape. After ordination he served curacies at Rawmarsh, Lickey and Alvechurch. He was a chaplain to the forces during World War I. After the war he was the incumbent at St George's, Worcester from  1920 to 1928; of Bulawayo from 1928 to 1936; and then of St Cuthbert, Port Elizabeth from 1936 to 1939.

References 

1856 births
1944 deaths
19th-century Anglican priests
20th-century Anglican priests
People educated at Marlborough College
Alumni of Ripon College Cuddesdon
Alumni of Keble College, Oxford
Archdeacons of Matabeleland
People from Mumbai
Anglican lay readers